Penstemon rostriflorus is a species of penstemon known by the common names beaked penstemon, Bridge penstemon, or Bridges' penstemon.

It is native to the Southwestern United States and California, where it grows in many types of sagebrush, chaparral, scrub, woodland, and forest habitat.

Description
Penstemon rostriflorus is a perennial herb growing in clumps of many erect stems from a woody base. It may reach 1 m (3 ft.) in height. The leaves are linear to lance-shaped, smooth-edged, and up to 7 centimeters long.

The glandular inflorescence bears tubular red to orange-red flowers 2 to 3 centimeters long. The mouth of the flower has a hooded upper lip and a three-lobed lower lip.

External links
Jepson Manual Treatment
Southwest Colorado Wildflowers
Photo gallery

rostriflorus
Flora of the Southwestern United States
Flora of California
Flora of New Mexico
Flora of the Great Basin
Flora of the Sierra Nevada (United States)
Natural history of the California chaparral and woodlands
Natural history of the Peninsular Ranges
Natural history of the Santa Monica Mountains
Natural history of the Transverse Ranges
Flora without expected TNC conservation status